Global Air may refer to:
Global Air (Australian airline)
 Global Air (Bulgaria); see List of defunct airlines of Bulgaria
Global Air (Mexico)
Swiss Global Air Lines